Claude Roussel (29 May 1941 – 19 May 1992) was a French bobsledder. He competed in the four-man event at the 1968 Winter Olympics.

References

External links
 

1941 births
1992 deaths
French male bobsledders
Olympic bobsledders of France
Bobsledders at the 1968 Winter Olympics